Felix Feist may refer to:

Felix E. Feist, American film and television director and writer
Felix F. Feist, his father, lyricist and Metro-Goldwyn-Mayer executive